Mona Rashid Al-Zayani is a Bahraini educator and politician. In 2000 she was appointed to the Consultative Council, becoming one of its first female members.

Biography
After completing a BA in English literacy at the University of Baghdad in Iraq, Al-Zayani earned an master of arts degree in curriculum and instruction at Norwich University a PhD degree in instruction from the University of Southern California instruction and curriculum in the United States. In 1985 she established the Al Hekma International School, serving as its president since its foundation.

In 2000 she was one of four women appointed to the Consultative Council by Emir Hamad bin Isa Al Khalifa, becoming its first female members. She remained a member until 2002.

In 2001 she was appointed director of the Bahraini branch of the Arab Open University, a role she held until 2003. In 2002 she became chairwoman of the new Gulf University.

References

Living people
University of Baghdad alumni
Norwich University alumni
University of Southern California alumni
Bahraini educators
Members of the Consultative Council (Bahrain)
21st-century Bahraini women politicians
21st-century Bahraini politicians
Academic staff of Arab Open University
Academic staff of Gulf University, Bahrain
Year of birth missing (living people)